The Reckless Way is a 1936 American comedy film directed by Raymond K. Johnson and starring Marian Nixon, Kane Richmond and Inez Courtney. The film's sets were designed by the art director Vin Taylor.

Synopsis
A woman working as a stenographer at a hotel manages to get a job modelling lingerie, sparking her ambitions to become a celebrity.

Cast
 Marian Nixon as Helen Rogers
 Kane Richmond as Jim Morgan
 Inez Courtney as Laura Jones
 Malcolm McGregor as Don Reynolds
 Harry Harvey as Joe Black
 Art Howard as Mr. Stoner
 Gloria Gordon as Mrs. Stoner
 William H. Strauss as Carl Blatz
 John S. Peters as Von Berg

References

Bibliography
 Pitts, Michael R. Poverty Row Studios, 1929-1940. McFarland & Company, 2005.

External links
 

1936 films
1936 comedy films
American comedy films
Films directed by Raymond K. Johnson
1930s English-language films
1930s American films